Donald Henry (24 June 1885 – 31 July 1973) was an Australian cricketer. He played in three first-class matches for South Australia in 1920/21.

See also
 List of South Australian representative cricketers

References

External links
 

1885 births
1973 deaths
Australian cricketers
South Australia cricketers
Cricketers from Adelaide